Mable "Madea" Earlene Simmons (née Baker/Murphy) is a character created and portrayed by Tyler Perry. She is portrayed as a tough, street-smart elderly African-American woman.

Madea is based on Perry's mother and his aunt. In Perry's own words, Madea is "exactly the PG version of my mother and my aunt, and I loved having an opportunity to pay homage to them. She would beat the hell out of you but make sure the ambulance got there in time to make sure they could set your arm back".

The Madea films/plays are comedies, but all contain serious themes and are intended to deliver moral messages about issues such as infidelity, spousal abuse and consequences of one's actions.

Fictional biography

Early years
Madea is said to be born in Greensburg, Louisiana on June 26, 1935, and raised in New Orleans, Louisiana.

Her age varies in different movies and plays. Madea was 68 in the first play, I Can Do Bad All by Myself, as well as Madea's Class Reunion. In A Madea Homecoming, set in 2022, it is said she is 95 years old, but with a birth year of 1935, she would actually be 87.

She is described as being brought up in poverty, growing up in a shotgun house with her parents and siblings. Madea has stated that although her family didn't have much, they had love.

When she was in her early teens, her family moved to Atlanta, Georgia, where they lived on the west side. She attended Booker T. Washington High School and was a cheerleader. In I Can Do Bad All by Myself, we learn that she once lived in Cleveland, Alabama, but later returned to Atlanta.

According to A Madea Christmas: The Play, Madea's mother, "Big Mabel" Murphy, was a hooker during Madea's childhood and was not at all religious. Madea grew up with little knowledge of religion, explaining why she has a tendency to misquote the Bible. Madea makes frequent reference to herself once being a hooker and a stripper.

Her maiden name is not stated, but it is presumably either Baker or Murphy, the last names of her father and mother, respectively.

It is not revealed where and when she met her first husband, Johnny. Madea and Johnny had their first child, Michelle, as young teens, possibly 15 or 16. When Madea was 18, she got pregnant with her other daughter, Cora, through a one-night stand. Sometime later, Madea and Johnny had a son, William. All of her children are said to be married and had children. Madea and Johnny raised three of their grandchildren, Maylee and Vianne "Khazzy" Simmons, after their daughter's death from drug addiction.

Criminal background
In Madea Goes to Jail we learn Madea's criminal record began at age nine with a charge of theft. She was charged with her first felony at this age, and her crimes began progressing to illegal gambling at age 18, which later evolved into check fraud, identity theft, insurance fraud (related to her nine deceased husbands), assault, attempted murder, road rage (usually when Madea is in vehicle), and vehicle theft.

In Diary of a Mad Black Woman, Madea and her granddaughter Helen McCarter were both charged with "criminal trespassing, reckless endangerment, criminal possession of a handgun, assault with a deadly weapon, [driving on a] suspended license, expired registration, reckless driving, and a broken taillight," which caused Judge Mablean Ephriam to place Madea on house arrest, while her granddaughter was bailed for $5,000.

In Madea's Family Reunion, Madea was brought before Judge Ephriam once again after she removed her ankle monitor in order to purchase her brother Joe's medication, in effect violating her house arrest. After rigorous efforts, Brian was finally able to persuade Madea to accept Judge Ephraim's ruling to become the foster mother of Nikki Grady.

In Meet the Browns, she was arrested for causing a high speed chase following a routine traffic stop, resisting arrest, and assaulting a police officer while Joe fled the area claiming that Madea kidnapped him.

In Madea Goes to Jail, Madea was placed under anger management by Judge Ephriam that was overseen by Phil McGraw in light of the car chase and the police officers failing to read Madea her Miranda rights and suspends her already suspended driver's license. In the same movie, she was arrested once again for removing a woman's Pontiac Solstice with a forklift and damaging it in the parking lot of the Big Kmart stealing Madea’s parking spot. She was sentenced to prison for 5 to 10 years by Judge Greg Mathis. This is later overturned and she as part of the "Georgia Seven"” are released.

In Madea's Big Happy Family, Madea smashes her car into the fast-food restaurant Snax out of frustration that the manager Sabrina won't give her food even using excuses related to her Cadillac's technical problems in order to persuade the manager to give her food while waiting. No police action was brought up.

In the animated film Madea's Tough Love, Madea is arrested for excessive damage to public property (which she unintentionally committed while chasing after two unruly skateboarders), two bench warrants, 25 unpaid parking tickets, and an unpaid speeding ticket. Then she was reassigned to house arrest for attacking mayoral candidate Betsy Holiday. Madea was released from the sentence when the truth about Betsy's secret illegal activities were exposed proving that Madea was right about her.

Media and entertainment featuring Madea
Madea has appeared in several plays (some of which have been recorded for repeated viewing), fully produced films, a couple of television programs (guest appearances), one book and one animated film. The character made her first appearance in the 1999 play I Can Do Bad All by Myself, later appearing in numerous other plays by Perry, then appearing in films based on those plays.

Plays (including recorded plays)
 I Can Do Bad All by Myself—1999
 Diary of a Mad Black Woman—2001
 Madea's Family Reunion—2002
 Madea's Class Reunion—2003
 Madea Goes to Jail—2005
 Madea's Big Happy Family—2010
 A Madea Christmas—2011
 Madea Gets a Job—2012
 Madea's Neighbors from Hell—2013
 Madea on the Run—2015
 Madea's Farewell—2019

Films
 Diary of a Mad Black Woman—2005
 Madea's Family Reunion—2006
 Meet the Browns (cameo)—2008
 Madea Goes to Jail—2009
 I Can Do Bad All by Myself—2009
 Madea's Big Happy Family—2011
 Madea's Witness Protection—2012
 A Madea Christmas—2013
 Boo! A Madea Halloween—2016
 Boo 2! A Madea Halloween—2017
 A Madea Family Funeral—2019
 A Madea Homecoming—2022

Animated film
 Madea's Tough Love—2015

Television series

House of Payne (guest appearances)
In the TBS comedy drama House of Payne pilot episode "Bully and the Beast", Madea was the foster mother of Nikki. She factored into the plot through a school altercation between her adopted daughter and Curtis Payne's great-nephew Malik. Curtis takes a particular disliking to Madea who is not in the least bit intimidated by Curtis at all. Rather conversely, Curtis became intimidated by Madea and had nightmares about her.

In the episode "The Wench Who Saved Christmas", Curtis tries to discourage everyone from having the Christmas spirit. He later fell asleep and dreamt that Madea was the Ghosts of Christmas past, present, and future. In this form, she tried to teach him a lesson about his killjoy behaviour.

In the episode "Wife Swap", Curtis' wife Ella chastises him for taking her for granted. That night, Curtis has an extended nightmare where he is married to Madea instead of Ella.

Meet the Browns (mentioned)
On another TBS series, Meet the Browns, Mable is said to be the mother of Cora Simmons as a result of a one-night stand with the show's lead character. She is an unseen character throughout the series.

Love Thy Neighbour (guest appearance) 
On January 21, 2015, Madea made a special guest appearance in the Oprah Winfrey Network comedy series, Love Thy Neighbor. The episode titled "Madea's Pressure Is Up" aired as part of the 3rd season of Love Thy Neighbour.

Miscellaneous
In a commercial for BET+, Tyler Perry explained this streaming service to Madea and Joe at the time when they were arguing on what to watch on TV.

Cast and characters

Book
Don't Make a Black Woman Take Off Her Earrings: Perry wrote the book in the character's persona. The book was published on April 11, 2006.

Reception
In 2009, Entertainment Weekly put the character on its end-of-the-decade, "best-of" list, saying, "Whether she's going to jail or just opening up a can of whupass, Tyler Perry's Madea is the profane, gun-toting granny you never had but (maybe) wish you did."

On April 1, 2013, Orlando Jones pulled an April Fools' Day prank, informing the public via his Huffington Post account that he would be replacing Perry as Madea. Jones led the public to believe that the decision had come amid Perry's prior obligations, assisting Oprah Winfrey with her struggling OWN network. As part of the prank, Jones released a photo of himself to the public in which he was impersonating Madea. In addition, he incorporated several pretend quotes seemingly issued by Perry, both acknowledging the news and giving Jones his blessing to continue on with the character. Unaware of the prank, fans responded with outrage and criticism. As result of increasing outcries from fans, Perry informed the public on April 15, 2013, that the news was untrue. Perry was quoted as stating "That was an April Fool's joke that HE did. Not true. And not funny. When I'm done with Madea, she is done."

Perry has been accused of minstrelsy and playing into black stereotypes with the Madea character, most notably by fellow black director Spike Lee. Perry's argument with Lee dates back to a 2009 interview in which Lee referred to Perry's films as "coonery buffoonery". Lee equated the Madea movies with the old-time minstrel shows which lampooned black people as dim-witted, lazy, buffoonish, superstitious and happy-go-lucky, and further stated that if a white director made a movie depicting black people in such a manner he would be ostracised. Perry responded by stating that his films were meant as entertainment and should not be taken so seriously, saying, "I am sick of him talking about me. I am sick of him saying, 'This is a coon, this is a buffoon.' I am sick of him talking about black people going to see movies. This is what he said: 'You vote by what you see'—as if black people don't know what they want to see. I am sick of him. He talked about Whoopi, he talked about Oprah, he talked about me, he talked about Clint Eastwood. Spike needs to shut the hell up!" Perry has been criticised for stereotyping black femininity using black masculinity. Some critics believe that the characterisation of Madea, in addition to other black women featured in Madea films, works to legitimise harmful and damaging stereotypes. There is growing concern around these depictions of blackness as critics believe they can have a negative impact on how black women see themselves in society and how they are perceived by others. In addition, Tyler Perry's role as Madea has received criticism due to some viewing his cross-gender acting as a misappropriation of drag culture. Critics have alleged Tyler Perry perpetuates patriarchal ideology through his characterisation of Madea and her interactions with other protagonists.

Parody and satire
 In the American Dad! episode "Spelling Bee My Baby," Steve Smith deliberately misspelled his words in a spelling bee so as to express his love for Akiko (who was also competing), instead spelling random Tyler Perry/Madea films.
 The character was parodied on The Boondocks episode "Pause", in which a thinly disguised version of Perry named Winston Jerome (voiced by Affion Crockett) plays a similar character to Madea called Ma Duke.
 In early December 2012, Madea was parodied on a Saturday Night Live episode by the episode's host Jamie Foxx.
 In the episode Funnybot from Season 15 of South Park, Perry (voiced by Trey Parker) played his character Madea after being repeatedly paid by Tolkien Black after every joke, and was trapped in a metallic shell by the Americans and the Germans to be left underground at the conclusion.
 Madea was parodied in the 2013 American satirical horror film Scary Movie 5, directed by Malcolm D. Lee. She is portrayed by actor Lewis Thompson.

See also
 Cross-gender acting
 Mrs. Brown's Boys

References

External links

 

Comedy theatre characters
Comedy film characters
Theatre characters introduced in 1999
Fictional African-American people
Fictional characters from Georgia (U.S. state)
Fictional characters from Louisiana
Film characters introduced in 1999
Girls with guns films
Tyler Perry
Female characters in theatre
Female characters in television
Fictional prisoners and detainees in the United States